The Rockdale County School District (also referred to as Rockdale County Public Schools or RCPS for short) is a public school district in Rockdale County, Georgia, United States, based in Conyers. It serves the communities of Conyers and Lakeview Estates. The current superintendent is Dr. Terry Oatts, who has been in this position since 2018.

Schools
The Rockdale County School District has eleven elementary schools, four middle schools, four non-traditional Schools, and three high schools.

Elementary schools
Barksdale Elementary School
Flat Shoals Elementary School
C.J. Hicks Elementary School
Hightower Trail Elementary School
Honey Creek Elementary School
J.H. House Elementary School
Lorraine Elementary School
Peek's Chapel Elementary School
Pine Street Elementary School
Shoal Creek Elementary School
Sims Elementary School

Middle schools
Conyers Middle School
Edwards Middle School
General Ray Davis Middle School
Memorial Middle School

High schools
 Heritage High School
 Rockdale County High School
 Salem High School

Non-Traditional Schools
Alpha Academy
Rockdale Career Academy
Rockdale Magnet School for Science and Technology (STEM Certified High School)
Rockdale Open Campus

References

External links

School districts in Georgia (U.S. state)
Education in Rockdale County, Georgia